The 2012 European 10 m Events Championships were held in Vierumäki, Finland from February 16-19, 2012.

Men's events

Women's events

Men's Junior events

Women's Junior events

Medal summary

Seniors

Juniors

See also
 European Shooting Confederation
 International Shooting Sport Federation
 List of medalists at the European Shooting Championships
 List of medalists at the European Shotgun Championships

References

External links
 Results

European Shooting Championships
European Shooting Championships
2012 European Shooting Championships
European 10 m Events Championships
Shooting competitions in Finland